Dona Isabel, Duchess of Braganza (née Isabel Inês Castro Curvello de Herédia; born 22 November 1966), is a Portuguese businesswoman who married Duarte Pio, Duke of Braganza, the current pretender to the defunct Portuguese throne.

Born into the family of Portuguese nobility, Dona Isabel worked as an assets manager prior to her marriage. Since marrying Duarte Pio, Dona Isabel has left the professional world, devoted her attention to her family, and become patron to several Portuguese charities and non-profit foundations. She and her husband have had three children together, thus securing the continuation of the House of Braganza.

Family 
Isabel Inês Castro Curvello de Herédia was born on 22 November 1966, in Lisbon, to Dom Jorge de Heredia (b. 1934), an architect, and Raquel Leonor Pinheiro de Castro Curvello (b. 1935), his wife. 

Since birth, she was entitled to the honorific styling of Dona (Lady), being a descendant in the male lineage of Francisco Correia de Herédia, Viscount of Ribeira Brava (a Vitalício title, meaning Life peerage) and his wife Dona  Joana Gil de Borja de Macedo e Meneses (1851-1925). Although Francisco was member of the Portuguese nobility, he was a famed republican, who was involved in the failed republican uprising of 28 January 1908.

Furthermore, Isabel de Herédia is the first cousin of Manuel Caldeira Cabral, former Portuguese Minister of Economy.

Early life 
Dona Isabel lived between metropolitan Portugal and Portuguese Angola until 1975, when Angola was granted independence. Her family subsequently moved to São Paulo, Brazil. There, she studied at the Colégio São Luís, a Jesuit-run institution. In 1990, she obtained a degree in business administration from the Fundação Getúlio Vargas and returned to Portugal to a job in BMF — Sociedade de Gestão de Patrimónios, S.A. She specialized as an asset manager.

Personal life 
On 13 May 1995 she married Duarte Pio de Bragança, at Jerónimos Monastery. Present at the ceremony were representatives of various European royal and noble houses: Prince Philippe, Duke of Brabant, Prince Henri, Hereditary Grand Duke of Luxembourg,  Infanta Margarita, Duchess of Soria, among others. The principal Portuguese political figures, including the President of the Republic Mário Soares, Prime Minister Aníbal Cavaco Silva, and President of the Assembly António Barbosa de Melo, were also present.

Following her marriage and the birth of her first child, Afonso, Isabel resigned from her professional life and devoted herself to the management of her family and the patronage of various causes.

Honours

Dynastic honours 
  9th Grand Mistress of the Order of Saint Isabel (House of Braganza)
  Dame Grand Cross of Justice of the Castroan-Two Sicilian Sacred Military Constantinian Order of Saint George (Castroan Royal Family of Two Sicilies)
  Dame Grand Cross of the Order of Prince Danilo I (Montenegrin Royal Family)

Foreign honours
 Dame Grand Cross of the Order of the Holy Sepulchre (Holy See)
 Dame Grand Cross of Honour and Devotion of the Sovereign Military Order of Malta, 3rd First Class (Sovereign Military Order of Malta)

Genealogy

Ancestry

Issue

References

External links
Website of the Foundation of the House of Braganza
Official Website of the House of Braganza

1966 births
Living people
Duchesses of Braganza
Dames of the Order of Saint Isabel
Portuguese Roman Catholics
People from Lisbon